Andrea Superti-Furga (born 1959 in Milan) is a Swiss-Italian pediatrician, geneticist and molecular biologist. He is the head of the Division of Genetic Medicine at the Lausanne University Hospital (CHUV) and a professor at the Faculty of Medicine and Biology of the University of Lausanne.

Career 
Superti-Furga was educated at the German School of Milan in Milan, where he obtained his Abitur in 1978. He studied medicine at the Universities of Milan, Genoa, and Zurich, and obtained his MD degrees from Genoa in 1984 and from Zurich in 1992. During his studies he has been mentored by Paolo Durand, Victor McKusick, Andrea Prader, Andres Giedion, Richard Gitzelmann, Beat Steinmann,  and Sergio Fanconi. He worked with Francesco Ramirez on genetic diseases in both Zurich and New York. In 2002, he was appointed professor for Molecular Pediatrics at the University of Lausanne, before moving as a professor and chairman of the Department of Pediatrics to the University of Freiburg, Germany in 2005. In 2010, he was awarded the Leenaards Chair of Excellence in Pediatrics at the University of Lausanne. From 2014 to 2015, he was director of the Department of Pediatrics in Lausanne. Since 2016, he has been professor and head of the Division of Genetic Medicine at the Lausanne University Hospital, Switzerland.

Research 
Superti-Furga's research activities have been focused on inborn errors of metabolism, inherited disorders of connective tissue, genetic bone disorders and skeletal dysplasias, dysmorphology, neurodevelopment, and bioinformatics. He was involved in the discovery of the molecular and biochemical basis of genetic disorders, such as the Ehlers-Danlos syndrome type IV related to collagen type III, the sulfate transporter (SLC26A2)-related chondrodysplasias, the TBX15-related Cousin syndrome, the FAM111A-related disorders Kenny-Caffey syndrome and Osteocraniostenosis, the tartrate-resistant acid phosphatase(ACP5)-related spondyloenchondrodysplasia, the SFRP4-related Pyle disease, the HSPA9-related EVEN-PLUS syndrome, sialic acid deficiency related to NANS and the malformation disorders related to EN1 (gene) and the EN1-regulating lncRNA element, MAENLI.

According to Google Scholar, Superti-Furga has published more than 300 articles and holds an h-index of 79 (February 2022).

Personal life 
Superti-Furga is married to Sheila Unger, geneticist at the Lausanne University Hospital. He is the brother of Giulio Superti-Furga, a molecular and system biologist, director of the Center for Molecular Medicine in Vienna.

Distinctions 
He is the recipient of the 2015 Maroteaux Award of the International Skeletal Dysplasia Society, the 2002 Cloëtta Prize by the Max Cloëtta Foundation, and the 1995 Georg-Friedrich Götz prize of the Medical School of the University of Zurich. In 2008, he was Santa Chiara visiting chair at University of Siena's School of Medicine.

He is a member of the executive board of the Swiss Academy of Medical Sciences (SAMW), and member of the German National Academy of Sciences Leopoldina. He is president of the committee for pediatrics of the Pfizer Prize Foundation as well as member of the scientific board of the Novartis Foundation for Medical-Biological Research.

Selected works

Papers

Books

References

External links 

 
 Website of Lausanne University Hospital's Division of Genetic Medicine

1959 births
Living people
University of Milan alumni
University of Genoa alumni
University of Zurich alumni
University of Freiburg alumni
Academic staff of the University of Lausanne
Human geneticists
Italian geneticists
Swiss physicians
Italian physicians
Italian pediatricians
Swiss pediatricians